The 2008 Atlético Nacional season was the club's 61st season since being founded in 1948. Nacional played in the 2008 Copa Libertadores since they won the Copa Mustang consecutively in the previous season (2007), making them the first team in Colombia to achieve this goal since the introduction of the new Copa Mustang format. Oscar Quintabani was the club's manager for the second year in a row. The team roster was almost the same as last year's.

Team Kit
This year Atlético Nacional will be changing manufacturers since their contract with Umbro expired; this year they will be featuring Marathon Sports as their new manufacturing sponsor. However, Postobón is still going to be their main shirt sponsor, making this their ninth year sponsoring the club.

|
|
|
|}

Team roster

Copa Mustang-I
As of January 18, 2008

Reserve & Youth Squad

Starting 11 Copa Mustang 2008-I

Copa Mustang-II
As of May 24, 2008

 (Captain)

 (vice-captain)

Reserve and youth squad

Starting 11 Copa Mustang 2008-II

Transfers
In:
David Córdoba From Cúcuta Deportivo
Juan Carlos Ramirez  From Santa Fe
Walter José Moreno From Cúcuta Deportivo
Carlos Villagra From Millonarios
Francisco Arrué From  Universidad de Chile
Eduardo Blandón From Millonarios
Giovanni Moreno From Envigado Fútbol Club
Jairo Palomino From Envigado Fútbol Club
Jhon Charría From Deportes Tolima
Carlos Rentería From Atlético Huila

Out:
Víctor Aristizábal  RetiredHenry Rojas To HuilaOscar Echeverry To New York Red BullsAndres David Saldarriaga To Cúcuta DeportivoWilliam Zapata To Cúcuta DeportivoIvan Hurtado To  Barcelona SCAldo Ramírez To  Monarcas MoreliaDavid Ospina Ramírez to  OGC NiceCamilo Perez to Envigado Fútbol ClubJuan Camilo Zuñiga To  AC SienaAll Competitions

Statistics

Appearances and goalsLast updated on 30 Nov 2008.|}

Copa Mustang

 Copa Mustang 2008-I 
The Copa Mustang 2008-I began on February 2 and ended on May 18. Atlético Nacional was a firm candidate to win the championship after winning both Colombian championships last year, but eventually had an underwhelming campaign, finishing 14th and missing out on the playoffs.

Results by round

League table

 Fixtures 

Copa Mustang 2008-II
The expectations for this season were high, since Nacional had a poor campaign in the previous Copa Mustang tournament. At the beginning of the 2008-II Copa Mustang Nacional was not as successful as it was thought they were going to be; mainly due to many changes in the squad, and this was highlighted by a 5-0 loss against Santa Fe. The club struggled to look for a place in the top 8 during the first half of the  tournament. In the other half the club was slightly getting back to shape by making the top 8 on five occasions, and it won its last three games, leading into a 3rd place finish in the last game of the tournament and qualifying to the Quadrangular Semifinals. In the quadrangular, Nacional finished last, without having a single win, and in its closing game against La Equidad at home, the club lost 4-1; only about 10,000 fans showed up to the game to see them lose on their 2008 season final game.

Results by round

 Fixtures 

Copa Colombia
Nacional had a decent run in the 2008 Copa Colombia, where they finished first in their group with only 1 loss against rivals DIM, but were unexpectedly eliminated by Primera B club Expreso Rojo in the third phase, which was the club that went the furthest in the tournament out of the clubs that weren't playing in the highest division.

 Group stage 

 Second phase Atletico Nacional won 6–2 on aggregate Third phase Expreso Rojo won 2–1 on aggregateCopa Libertadores
Nacional made a good appearance in the 2008 Copa Libertadores. In the group stage they held the first place for the first five games, then in the last one when they lost 1-0 to São Paulo they went down to second place. In the round of 16 they had to play against Fluminense; in the first game Nacional lost at home 1-2, later in the second leg they lost 1-0 to the Brazilian club at Maracanã Stadium, which meant that Fluminense advanced to the next round, and Nacional were eliminated from the tournament.

 Group stage 

 Round of 16 Fluminense won 3–1 on aggregate.''

References

External links

2008